Chandni Chowk, Kolkata is a metro station of the Kolkata Metro.It is located in Central Avenue, Chandni Chowk, Bowbazar, Kolkata, West Bengal, India.

History

Construction

The station

Structure
Chandni Chowk is underground metro station, situated on the Kolkata Metro Line 1 of Kolkata Metro.

Layout

Station layout

Connections

Bus
Bus route number 3B, 30C, 47B, 78, 214, 214A, 237, 242, S139 (Mini), S160 (Mini), S161 (Mini), E25, S9A, S10, S10A, S11, S15G, S17A, AC20, AC39 etc. serve the station.

Entry/Exit

Gallery

See also

Kolkata
List of Kolkata Metro stations
Transport in Kolkata
Kolkata Metro Rail Corporation
Kolkata Suburban Railway
Kolkata Monorail
Trams in Kolkata
Bhowanipore
Chowringhee Road
List of rapid transit systems
List of metro systems

References

External links
 
 Official Website for line 1
 UrbanRail.Net – descriptions of all metro systems in the world, each with a schematic map showing all stations.

Kolkata Metro stations
Railway stations in Kolkata
Railway stations opened in 1995